The  is a Bo-Bo-Bo wheel arrangement diesel-electric locomotive type operated by the Japan Freight Railway Company (JR Freight) and the Kyushu Railway Company.

, JR Freight operates 48 Class DF200s, and JR Kyushu operates one (DF200-7000).

Variants
 DF200-900
 DF200-0
 DF200-50
 DF200-100
 DF200-200
 DF200-7000 (JR Kyushu)

DF200-900
The pre-production locomotive DF200-901 was delivered in March 1992 for testing. It has two MTU 12V396TE14 diesel engines.

DF200-0
Full-production batch delivered from 1994. Red "JRF" logos were later replaced by white logos. 12 locomotives were built.

DF200-50
Batch built from March 2000 with Komatsu SDA12V170-1 diesel engines in place of the earlier MTU engines. External changes include grey front-end skirts, white "JRF" logos, and "Red Bear Eco Power" logos. 13 locomotives were built.

DF200-100
Batch built from August 2005 to December 2011 with IGBT VVVF inverters. 23 Class DF200-100 locomotives were built.

DF200-200
In 2016, DF200-123 was moved from Hokkaido to Suita Depot in Osaka, where it underwent modifications and renumbering to DF200-223 before being returned to service on the Kansai Main Line in the Nagoya area. This was followed by locomotives DF200-116 and DF200-120, which were similarly modified and renumbered DF200-216 and DF200-220 respectively in 2018.

DF200-7000

A dedicated Class DF200-7000 diesel locomotive was built in 2013 for JR Kyushu's Seven Stars in Kyushu luxury excursion train. Built specially for use in Kyushu and finished in a deep maroon livery, the locomotive was built by Kawasaki Heavy Industries in Kobe, and delivered in July 2013.

Classification

The DF200 classification for this locomotive type is explained below.
 D: Diesel locomotive
 F: Six driving axles
 200: Diesel-electric locomotive with AC motors

References

External links

 JR Freight website 
 Details on Kawasaki Heavy Industries website 

Diesel-electric locomotives of Japan
DF200
DF200
Bo-Bo-Bo locomotives
1067 mm gauge locomotives of Japan
Railway locomotives introduced in 1994
Kawasaki diesel locomotives